Zhengdao Wang is a Chinese-American electrical engineer specializing in coding theory and signal processing for wireless communication. He is a professor of electrical and computer engineering at Iowa State University, and a program director in the Division of Electrical, Communications and Cyber Systems of the National Science Foundation.

Education
In 1996, Wang earned a bachelor's degree in engineering, specializing in electrical engineering and computer science, from the University of Science and Technology of China. He came to the US for graduate study in electrical engineering, earning a master's degree from the University of Virginia in 1999 and completing a Ph.D. at the University of Minnesota in 2002.

Recognition
Wang was named a Fellow of the IEEE in 2016, "for contributions to multicarrier communications and performance analysis of wireless 
systems".

References

External links

Year of birth missing (living people)
Living people
American electrical engineers
Chinese electrical engineers
University of Science and Technology of China alumni
University of Virginia School of Engineering and Applied Science alumni
University of Minnesota College of Science and Engineering alumni
Fellow Members of the IEEE